Albert E. Ottinger (September 10, 1878 – January 13, 1938) was an American lawyer and politician.

Life and career
Ottinger was born in Manhattan, New York City, the son of Moses Ottinger and Amelia Gottlieb Ottinger.  He graduated from New York University Law School in 1898 and became an attorney in New York City.

He was a member of the New York State Senate (18th District) in 1917 and 1918; and then an assistant attorney general of the United States. As such, Ottinger ruled that the U.S. Congress could grant independence to the Philippines if it wished, since the Philippines were an "insular possession" and therefore to be distinguished from the United States' states and territorial possessions.

He was New York State attorney general from 1925 to 1928, elected in 1924 and 1926. During his second term, he was the only Republican who held state office, and was responsible for closing down the notorious "bucket shops" on Wall Street. He was a delegate to the 1928 and 1932 Republican National Conventions.

In 1928, while the Democratic Party nominated New York Governor Al Smith for the presidency, the first time a Catholic from a major party was running for that office, the Republican Party of New York nominated Ottinger for governor, the first Jewish gubernatorial candidate in New York history. The Democratic Party nominated Franklin D. Roosevelt for governor, and Herbert Lehman, also a Jew, as the candidate for lieutenant governor of New York. On the national ticket, Herbert Hoover won by a landslide over Al Smith, the latter's religion clearly a national issue. The gubernatorial contest, however, was one of the closest in New York history. Against the national Republican trend, Roosevelt won by only 25,000 votes, less than 1% of the four million ballots cast.

At the end of his term as New York state's attorney general, Ottinger summed up his record as follows: "Hammer, hammer, hammer, at every manner and means of fraud and dishonesty, the prevention and assertion of which the Legislature has assigned to the Attorney General."

Ottinger suffered a heart attack and died in New York City on January 13, 1938.  He was buried at Union Field Cemetery in Ridgewood, Queens, New York.

Family
Ottinger never married and was survived by three brothers: Leon, Lawrence, and Nathan. Nathan Ottinger was a justice of the New York Supreme Court.  Lawrence Ottinger was the father of Richard L. Ottinger, who served as a member of the United States House of Representatives.

References

Sources
Obit notice, in Time magazine on January 24, 1938
List of New York attorneys general, at Office of the NYSAG

1878 births
1938 deaths
Jewish American state legislators in New York (state)
New York (state) state senators
New York State Attorneys General
People from Manhattan
New York University School of Law alumni
Burials in New York (state)